Tafsîr al-Mishbâh is the monumental work of tafsir by an Indonesian Islamic scholar, Muhammad Quraish Shihab. Published by Lentera Hati in 2001, Tafsir al-Mishbah is the first complete 30 Juz interpretation of the Qur'an in the last 30 years. The tafsir is aimed at interpretation of the Qur'an in relations to contemporary issues.

Naming

Al-Mishbah means "lantern", which connotes the meaning of life and matters of the people illuminated by the light of the Qur'an. As is the name, the author aims to preach the Qur'an to be more "grounded" and easy to understand.

Content
Quraish Shihab begins by explaining the purposes of interpreting God's word in accordance with the cultural and conditional environment surrounding the person, and how science and the messages of the Qur'an can be extracted. According to Shihab, the majesty of God's word can accommodate all the different conditions lived by the person. Shihab also mentions regarding mufassir, who's demanded to explain the values which are in line with the development of society, so that the Qur'an can actually serve as a guide. There's also the issue of the separation between the haq (reality) and batil (vanity) and the way out for everyday problems human being faces, which is required as well for mufassir to remove the misunderstanding towards the Qur'an or the content of the verses.

An observer of the work of Nusantara interpretation, Howard M. Federspiel, believes that the works of Quraish Shihab commentary confidently assist the contemporary Indonesian society in terms of religious issues.

See also
 Islam Nusantara

References

External links

Islam in Indonesia
Mishbah